The 2004–05 LNAH season was the ninth season of the Ligue Nord-Américaine de Hockey (before 2004 the Quebec Semi-Pro Hockey League), a minor professional league in the Canadian province of Quebec. 10 teams participated in the regular season, and Radio X de Quebec won the league title.

Regular season

Coupe Futura-Playoffs 
Won by Radio X de Québec.

External links 
 Statistics on hockeydb.com

Ligue Nord-Américaine de Hockey seasons
3